The 1971 Redwood Bank Pacific Coast Open was a men's tennis tournament played on outdoor hard courts at the Berkeley Tennis Club in Berkeley, California in the United States. The event was part of both the 1971 Grand Prix and World Championship Tennis circuit. It was the 83rd edition of the tournament and ran from September 27 through October 3, 1971. First-seeded Rod Laver won the singles title and earned $10,000 first-prize money.

Finals

Singles

 Rod Laver defeated  Ken Rosewall 6–4, 6–4, 7–6
 It was Laver's 6th singles title of the year and the 35th of his career in the Open Era.

Doubles

 Roy Emerson /  Rod Laver defeated  Ken Rosewall /  Fred Stolle 6–3, 6–3

See also
 Laver–Rosewall rivalry

References

External links
 ITF tournament edition details

Redwood Bank Pacific Coast Open
Redwood Bank Pacific Coast Open
Pacific Coast Championship
Redwood Bank Pacific Coast Open
Redwood Bank Pacific Coast Open
Redwood Bank Pacific Coast Open
Redwood Bank Pacific Coast Open